Chacón is a Spanish surname. Notable people with the surname include:

Alex Pineda Chacón (born 1969), coach for the Atlanta Silverbacks
Alicia R. Chacón (born 1938), American politician and judge
Antonio Chacón (1869–1929), flamenco singer
Arturo Chacón Cruz (born 1977), Mexican tenor
Bobby Chacon (1951), American boxer
Carme Chacón (1971–2017), Catalan politician
Cecilia Chacón (born 1971), Peruvian politician
Charyl Chacón (born 1985), beauty pageant title-holder
Diego Fajardo Chacón, Spanish military governor of the Philippines
Dulce Chacón (1954–2003), Spanish poet
Elio Chacón (1936–1992), Venezuelan baseball player
Iris Chacón (born 1950), Puerto Rican dancer
José Chacón (disambiguation), several people
Lázaro Chacón González (1873–1931), President of Guatemala
Manuel Aguilar Chacón (1797–1846), head of state of Costa Rica, elected in 1837
Oscar Baylón Chacón (born 1929), Mexican politician
Peter R. Chacon (born 1925), Californian politician
Pablo Chacón (born 1975), boxer from Argentina
Pelayo Chacón (1888-after 1930), Negro and Cuban League baseball player
Shawn Chacón (born 1977), former Major League Baseball player
Soledad Chacón (1890–1936), American politician

See also 
Chacon (disambiguation)
Chaconne, a musical form

Spanish-language surnames